In aerodynamics, the normal shock tables are a series of tabulated data listing the various properties before and after the occurrence of a normal shock wave.  With a given upstream Mach number, the post-shock Mach number can be calculated along with the pressure, density, temperature, and stagnation pressure ratios.  Such tables are useful since the equations used to calculate the properties after a normal shock are cumbersome.

The tables below have been calculated using a heat capacity ratio, equal to 1.4.  The upstream Mach number, begins at 1 and ends at 5.  Although the tables could be extended over any range of Mach numbers, stopping at Mach 5 is typical since assuming  to be 1.4 over the entire Mach number range leads to errors over 10% beyond Mach 5.

Normal shock table equations
Given an upstream Mach number, and the ratio of specific heats, the post normal shock Mach number, can be calculated using the equation below.

The next equation shows the relationship between the post normal shock pressure, and the upstream ambient pressure, .

The relationship between the post normal shock density, and the upstream ambient density,  is shown next in the tables.

Next, the equation below shows the relationship between the post normal shock temperature, and the upstream ambient temperature, .

Finally, the ratio of stagnation pressures is shown below where  is the upstream stagnation pressure and  occurs after the normal shock.  The ratio of stagnation temperatures remains constant across a normal shock since the process is adiabatic.

Note that before and after the shock the isentropic relations are valid and connect static and total quantities. That means,  (comes from Bernoulli, assumes incompressible flow) because the flow is for Mach numbers greater than unity always compressible.

The normal shock tables (for γ = 1.4)

See also
Normal shock
Mach number
Compressible flow

References

External links
 University of Cincinnati shock relations calculator

Aerospace engineering
Aerodynamics